Oh No, Ross and Carrie! is an investigative journalism podcast produced in Los Angeles and distributed by the Maximum Fun network. The hosts personally investigate claims about spirituality, fringe science, religion, and the paranormal, then discuss their findings on the show. The motto of the podcast is "We show up so you don't have to."

History

The hosts, Ross Blocher and Carrie Poppy, met at a book club meeting at the Center for Inquiry (CFI) West, where they discovered they had a mutual love for The Simpsons television program. They were also both interested in religion and fringe science, so they decided to attend a meeting of the Kabbalah Centre in LA together and analyze the claims made there. That experience inspired them to start their own podcast centered around such investigations.

The first episode, based on their experiences at the Kabbalah Centre, was released on 10 March 2011. The show was independently distributed until it became part of the Maximum Fun network in January 2014. Funding for the hosts' investigations comes from listener donations.

Blocher and Poppy have since investigated a number of religious groups, fringe science claims, and alternative medicine modalities, including Mormonism, dowsing, and Reiki healing.

The podcast has been ranked among the top 100 podcasts on iTunes in Australia, Canada, the United Kingdom, and the United States. The highest ranking it has achieved in each country is #30 in Australia, #28 in Canada, #93 in the UK, and #36 in the U.S. It has also been one of the most downloaded podcasts on iTunes in the Religion and Spirituality category, ranking as high as #11 on 9 February 2014.

Scientology investigation 
Beginning in February 2016, they released a series of episodes about their investigation of the Church of Scientology. In their first Scientology episode, the pair state that an investigation of Scientology was their most frequent request. The Scientology episodes were recommended by The Guardian, The A.V. Club, Boing Boing, and SplitSider. , there are ten episodes devoted to the Scientology investigation – 9 original episodes in 2016, and a follow-up episode in 2017. Former senior Scientology executive Mike Rinder said of one episode that "the insight into the current state of affairs inside LA Org is revelatory" because Blocher was the only person in attendance at the introductory classes, despite Scientology's claims that their Los Angeles site is an ideal example of Scientology's success.

Awards

Format
Most episodes feature Blocher and Poppy talking about their experiences during a recent investigation they performed, while some episodes are based on interviews with guests who have some relation to a recent investigation. The investigations usually take place in the Los Angeles area, although some have occurred in other areas of California and Arizona, or even internationally. When investigating a claim, the hosts generally attend meetings or sessions having conducted little background research in order to get a feel for what the average person would experience. They perform the investigations undercover and only reveal that they are journalists if asked. On one occasion, when investigating the Ordo Templi Orientis, they used assumed names to protect their identities. Some investigations are continued over the span of more than one episode.

The hosts have even gone so far as to be baptized into the Church of Jesus Christ of Latter-day Saints and the Raëlian UFO religion to more fully explore the teachings of these religions. Poppy was also certified as a Reiki healer in the course of an investigation.

At the end of each investigation, the hosts subjectively rate the level of pseudoscience, creepiness, danger, and cost (or "pocket drainer" value) of the claim or group they studied using ten-point scales. The pseudoscience rating is based on a scale in which the theory of evolution has a score of 1 (completely scientific) and the idea that humans are made completely of goat sperm has a score of 10 (completely pseudoscientific). Poppy also frequently gives a "hot drink" rating, at the end of the investigation.

The show is produced by Ian Kremer, and the theme music was created by Brian Keith Dalton, producer of the Mr. Deity video series.

Blocher and Poppy intermittently perform a live version of the show. In an interview with Richard Saunders Blocher said that the live show gives them a great opportunity to "meet people in person and know that our message... of having fun with zany beliefs resonates with people"

Guests
In addition to episodes about investigations, Blocher and Poppy have also released episodes based on interviews with guests who have some relation to or expertise in the subject of a recent investigation. Notable guests include:
 Brian Keith Dalton, producer of Mr. Deity
 Mark Edward, mentalist and psychic entertainer
 Emery Emery, comedian and podcast host
 Susan Gerbic, skeptical activist
 Roger Nygard, film director
 Don Prothero, paleontologist
 Mike Rinder, former Scientologist
 Jon Ronson, author
 Eugenie Scott, anthropologist and advocate for evolution education
 Louis Theroux, documentary filmmaker who made My Scientology Movie

Hosts

Ross Blocher lives in the Los Angeles area. He works as a Training Project Manager at Walt Disney Animation Studios, and has a BFA in animation from Woodbury University, He has worked in technical capacities on films such as The Simpsons Movie, The Princess and the Frog and Frozen. Blocher also investigates fringe science and spirituality with the Independent Investigations Group. Both of Blocher's parents were teachers of mathematics.

Carrie Poppy is a writer and actress living in Los Angeles. She studied theater and philosophy at the University of the Pacific, then studied improvisation and sketch comedy at The Groundlings. She previously worked for the James Randi Educational Foundation and currently writes an investigative column for Skeptical Inquirer magazine. She is vegan and active in the animal rights movement.

Both Blocher and Poppy are former evangelical Christians but are no longer religious believers.

Blocher and Poppy presented a workshop on investigation techniques, along with the hosts of the MonsterTalk podcast, at The Amaz!ng Meeting 2012. At that same meeting, Poppy gave a talk on the importance of using inclusive language when reaching out to people with beliefs that are different from one's own.

See also 
 Religion and spirituality podcast
 List of religion and spirituality podcasts

References

External links
 

2011 podcast debuts
Maximum Fun
Science podcasts
Scientific skepticism mass media
Religion and spirituality podcasts
Audio podcasts
American podcasts